Sogdian is a Unicode block containing characters used to write the Sogdian language from the 7th to 14th centuries CE.

Block

History
The following Unicode-related documents record the purpose and process of defining specific characters in the Sogdian block:

Font 
There is a Unicode font encoding Sogdian - Noto Sans Sogdian.

References 

Unicode blocks